R Cancri is a Mira variable in the constellation Cancer. Located approximately  distant, it varies between magnitudes 6.07 and 12.3 over a period of approximately 357 days.

References

Mira variables
Cancer (constellation)
M-type giants
Cancri, R
3248
69243
Emission-line stars
040543
Durchmusterung objects